The Youth Parliament of Malaysia is a youth council and simulation of the parliamentary proceedings of the Parliament of Malaysia for youth aged between 18 and 25. The Youth Parliament give young people an insight into the workings of the Parliament of Malaysia and raise their awareness of the working of government. Three sessions are held each year (three days for each session), each involving 133 elected members.

In the 2014 election, 8,632 from 171,094 youth registered voters aged between 15 and 40 across the Malaysian states have done voting in the two-weeks polling day. The nationwide low turnout is just 5.05%. Only 171,094 (1.4%) from about 12 million Malaysian youths registered their name in the official website of the Youth Parliament. It shows the youth participation in the inaugural election was disappointing.

Other related programme involving Malaysian youth is Perdana Fellows Programme (since 2015).

Timeline
 First Youth Parliament of Malaysia
 Postponed several times from 2013 due to poor management and planning
 Voter Registration : 1 July – 31 August 16 September 2014
 Nomination : 8–24 September 2014 
 Election : 22–31 October 2014
 2015 sitting
 First session  : 10–11 January 2015
 Second session : 11–13 May 2015
 Third session : 21–22 September 2015
 2016 sitting
 First session : 17–18 February 2016
 Second session : 9–10 August 2016
Second Youth Parliament of Malaysia
 Voter Registration : 1 March – 20 September 2016
 Nomination : 13 July – 13 August 2016
Third Youth Parliament of Malaysia
 Voter Registration : Several times between April until 2 July 2019
 Nomination : Several times between May until 4 July 2019
 Election : 16-26 August 2019
 Result : 28 August 2019
 First session : 25-26 September 2019

Format
The format of the unicameral Youth Parliament of Malaysia resembles that of the actual Dewan Rakyat, the lower house of Parliament of Malaysia, All the 119 members undergo the orientation session for four days, and also briefed at a pre-sitting session. The delegations are then spread out in different committees, each committee with a particular topic. This ensures a maximized cultural diversity in the committee and serves as a strong incentive to socialize and make friends with people from the committee. The committees debates a certain topic extensively and drafts a resolution, a non-binding piece of legislation outlining the key issues of the topic and proposing solutions. The drafting process is followed by lobbying, during which delegates may debate and propose amendments for other resolutions. The session ends with a General Assembly, resolutions and amendments are debated and voted upon by all of the delegates. During voting, the resolutions received would be given rankings and preferences. Any successful resolutions are then forwarded to the Attorney-General's Chambers, Cabinet of Malaysia and Parliament of Malaysia. Question time also included involving the Ministers and Deputy Ministers related with the question to give oral answers in the Youth Parliament.

However, unlike the Dewan Rakyat sitting, there will be no government and opposition sides, but the members will sit according to their respective committee. There were nine committees altogether namely, the Socio-Economics; International and Diplomatic Relations; Security, Law and Integrity; Education and Careers; as well as Culture, Sports, Patriotism and Integration. Other than that, Infrastructure, Development and Environment; Community Development and Health; Technology and Innovation; as well as Human Capital.

As a model Parliament for young people, the Youth Parliament of Malaysia is patterned after the Dewan Rakyat although its membership is smaller than that of the Dewan Rakyat. Wherever possible, the Youth Parliament of Malaysia follows the rules of procedures and conduct of business as close to the Dewan Rakyat as practical. However, practices from other Parliaments are also adopted to expose Malaysian Youth to comparative parliamentary practices. Standing Order of Youth Parliament of Malaysia are provided to new members at the time of Orientation after their selection.

Election procedure
Any Malaysian citizen aged between 15 and 25 is eligible to register as the voters in the official website of the Youth Parliament. The quick and simple online registration requires the person to give valid personal information. Any registered voters aged between 18 and 25 may qualify to become nominator and candidate. The qualification criteria can be referred in the official website. The nomination open for two weeks. The successful shortlisted candidates may use social media to campaign; the campaign is open for two weeks. After the campaign week ended, the registered voters have a right to vote online as many as quota available for their respective states through the official website. There are limit quota member allocated for every state according to the youth populations, using the scales: 1 member to 100,000 youth population. As a comparison, the youth voters from Perlis allowed to choose two candidates to represent Perlis to the Youth Parliament while the youth voters from Selangor can choose 25 candidates to represent Selangor to the Youth Parliament. The polling open for two weeks and the result would be announced two days after the closing day of polling. The election uses the plurality-at-large voting, a non-proportional voting system for electing several representatives simultaneously from a single state.

Composition
In the Youth Parliament sessions, every members shall be referred according to their representing states together with their unique number.

The total membership of Youth Parliament is 138. The breakdown of membership is as follows:

See also
 Model parliament
 European Youth Parliament
 United Kingdom Youth Parliament
 Ministry of Youth and Sports (Malaysia)

References

External links 

 
 Standing Order
 Youth Parliament of Malaysia on Astro Awani

Youth councils
Youth organisations based in Malaysia
Parliament of Malaysia
Youth empowerment organizations
2015 establishments in Malaysia
Youth-led organizations
Youth model government
Ministry of Youth and Sports (Malaysia)